Live in Sweden may refer to:

Live in Sweden, album by Theatre of Hate 2006
Live In Sweden, by Albert King 1980 DVD
Live In Sweden, album by Vixen (band) 2013 
Live In Sweden, album by Mott The Hoople 1971 
Live in Sweden (Stiff Little Fingers bootleg album)
Live in Sweden (Incubus album) 2004